Linda Swartz Taglialatela (born October 22, 1949) is a diplomat and United States Ambassador to Barbados, the Eastern Caribbean and the OECS. She was nominated by President Obama and confirmed by the Senate on December 9, 2015. On February 1, 2016,  she presented her credentials to Sir Elliott Belgrave, Governor-General of Barbados.

Early life and education
Taglialatela was born Linda Swartz to Anne and Leon E. Swartz, a veteran and I.B.M. employee. She grew up in Broome County, New York. In 1967 she graduated from Vestal High School. She completed her undergraduate studies in 1971 at the State University of New York at Oneonta, where she was awarded a B.A. in Economics.  She earned her M.B.A. from Virginia Tech.

Career
Taglialatela began a career in the public sector in 1973 as a management analyst at the Government Accountability Office. She joined the Foreign Service in 1979. As part of her assignment in the Office of the Inspector General, she inspected dozens of embassies and consulates.

In 1987 Taglialatela accepted an assignment at the embassy in Bern, Switzerland. Two years later she returned to Washington, D.C.  to join the Office of Resource Management and Organization Analysis. In 2002 she became Deputy Assistant Secretary of State in the Bureau of Human Resources.

In 2016 she began her role as Ambassador to Antigua and Barbuda, Barbados, Dominica, Grenada, Saint Kitts and Nevis, Saint Lucia, and Saint Vincent and the Grenadines. By March 2016 she had begun touring her region and presenting her credentials.

See also

List of current ambassadors of the United States

References

|-

|-

|-

|-

|-

|-

|-

|-

1949 births
Living people
Ambassadors of the United States to Antigua and Barbuda
Ambassadors of the United States to Barbados
Ambassadors of the United States to Dominica
Ambassadors of the United States to Grenada
Ambassadors of the United States to Saint Kitts and Nevis
Ambassadors of the United States to Saint Lucia
Ambassadors of the United States to Saint Vincent and the Grenadines
Obama administration personnel
State University of New York at Oneonta alumni
Virginia Tech alumni
United States Foreign Service personnel
21st-century American diplomats
American women ambassadors
21st-century American women